The Maserati A6GCM is a single seater racing car from the Italian manufacturer Maserati. Developed for Formula Two, 12 cars were built between 1951 and 1953.

Introduction

The A6GCM belongs to the A6 family of Maserati vehicles which comprised many models from street cars to racing cars. The name of the car is derived as follows:

A6 : the name of the series : A for Alfieri (Maserati), 6 for 6 cylinders

G : Ghisa, the engine block was in cast iron

C : Corsa, for Racing

M : Monoposto, for single seater.

The Tipo6 CS (Corsa Sportivo: barchetta) has been spotted as a good contender even in front of single seaters in Formula 2, despite its small engine. Thus Maserati decided to develop a specific model that would meet the new FIA racing rules.

Design

It was developed by Alberto Massimino and Vittorio Bellentani.
 Initially with a  capacity (with a compression ratio of 13.5 :1) delivering , in 1951 and 1952
 Then  capacity (with a compression ratio of 13.5 :1, with twin ignition) delivering , in late 1952
 And finally with a  capacity , with a compression ratio of 12 :1, with twin ignition) delivering , in 1953.
The engine was mated to a 4-speed gearbox.

The frame was developed by Medardo Fantuzzi. The rigid rear axle employed cantilevered leaf springs combined with Houdaille shock absorbers; in front, coil springs are used also combined with Houdaille shock absorbers. The brakes are hydraulic driven drums.

Evolution

The 1953 version was the work of Gioacchino Colombo who modified the car significantly: now with a nearly  engine, new suspension and improved brakes. The body was also reworked and made narrower and the car received an oval front grill. This version is known as the "interim" A6GCM or A6SSG.

The A6GCM foreshadowed the next model: the 250F. In fact several of the later A6GCMs, produced in late 1952 and 1953, were converted to 250Fs in 1954.

Results

The same model raced in Formula One races and in Formula Two, in races which counted for the World Championship as well as in non-championship events, as it was often the case in the early 1950s.

With 151 race starts and 81 race finishes, with 23 podiums and 6 Grand Prix race wins, the A6GCM has had an exceptional track record supported by exceptional drivers.

Note: when Maserati competed in its home town, Modena, in 1953, it managed to finish in the top three positions.

Podium finishes

References

External links

A6GCM
Maserati Formula One cars